Bill Clinton, the 42nd president of the United States, was impeached by the United States House of Representatives of the 105th United States Congress on December 19, 1998, for "high crimes and misdemeanors". The House adopted two articles of impeachment against Clinton, with the specific charges against Clinton being lying under oath and obstruction of justice. Two other articles had been considered but were rejected by the House vote.

Clinton's impeachment came after a formal House inquiry, which had been launched on October 8, 1998. The charges for which Clinton was impeached stemmed from a sexual harassment lawsuit filed against Clinton by Paula Jones. During pre-trial discovery in the lawsuit, Clinton gave testimony denying that he had engaged in a sexual relationship with White House intern Monica Lewinsky. The catalyst for the president's impeachment was the Starr Report, a September 1998 report prepared by Ken Starr, Independent Counsel, for the House Judiciary Committee. The Starr Report included details outlining a sexual relationship between Clinton and Lewinsky Clinton was the second American president to be impeached, the first being Andrew Johnson, who was impeached in 1868.

The approved articles of impeachment would be submitted to the United States Senate on January 7, 1999. A trial in the Senate then began, with Chief Justice William Rehnquist presiding. On February 12, Clinton was acquitted on both counts as neither received the necessary two-thirds majority vote of the senators present for conviction and removal from office—in this instance 67. On Article One, 45 senators voted to convict while 55 voted for acquittal. On Article Two, 50 senators voted to convict while 50 voted for acquittal. Clinton remained in office for the remainder of his second term.

Background 

In 1994, Paula Jones filed a lawsuit accusing Clinton of sexual harassment when he was governor of Arkansas. Clinton attempted to delay a trial until after he left office, but in May 1997 the Supreme Court unanimously rejected Clinton's claim that the Constitution immunized him from civil lawsuits, and shortly thereafter the pre-trial discovery process commenced.

Separate from this, in January 1994, Attorney General Janet Reno appointed Robert B. Fiske as an Independent counsel to investigate the Whitewater controversy. In August of that year, Ken Starr is appointed to replace Fiske in this role.

In 1997, the first effort in Congress to start an impeachment against Clinton was launched by Republican Congressman Bob Barr.

Jones's attorneys wanted to prove Clinton had engaged in a pattern of behavior with women who supported her claims. In late 1997, Linda Tripp began secretly recording conversations with her friend Monica Lewinsky, a former intern and Department of Defense employee. In those recordings, Lewinsky divulged that she had a sexual relationship with Clinton. Tripp shared this information with Jones's lawyers, who added Lewinsky to their witness list in December 1997. According to the Starr Report, a U.S. federal government report written by appointed Independent Counsel Ken Starr on his investigation of President Clinton, after Lewinsky appeared on the witness list Clinton began taking steps to conceal their relationship. Some of the steps he took included suggesting to Lewinsky that she file a false affidavit to misdirect the investigation, encouraging her to use cover stories, concealing gifts he had given her, and attempting to help her find gainful employment to try to influence her testimony.

In a January 17, 1998, sworn deposition, Clinton denied having a "sexual relationship", "sexual affair", or "sexual relations" with Lewinsky. His lawyer, Robert S. Bennett, stated with Clinton present that Lewinsky's affidavit showed there was no sex in any manner, shape or form between Clinton and Lewinsky. The Starr Report states that the following day, Clinton "coached" his secretary Betty Currie into repeating his denials should she be called to testify.

After rumors of the scandal reached the news, Clinton publicly said, "I did not have sexual relations with that woman, Miss Lewinsky." But months later, Clinton admitted his relationship with Lewinsky was "wrong" and "not appropriate". Lewinsky engaged in oral sex with Clinton several times.

The judge in the Jones case later ruled the Lewinsky matter immaterial, and threw out the case in April 1998 on the grounds that Jones had failed to show any damages. After Jones appealed, Clinton agreed in November 1998 to settle the case for $850,000 while still admitting no wrongdoing.

The Starr Report was released to Congress on September 9, 1998, and to the public on September 11. In the report, Starr argued that there were eleven possible grounds for impeachment of Clinton, including perjury, obstruction of justice, witness tampering, and abuse of power. The report also detailed explicit and graphic details of the sexual relationship between Clinton and Lewinsky.

Independent counsel investigation 

The charges arose from an investigation by Ken Starr, an Independent Counsel. With the approval of United States Attorney General Janet Reno, Starr conducted a wide-ranging investigation of alleged abuses, including the Whitewater controversy, the firing of White House travel agents, and the alleged misuse of FBI files. On January 12, 1998, Linda Tripp, who had been working with Jones's lawyers, informed Starr that Lewinsky was preparing to commit perjury in the Jones case and had asked Tripp to do the same. She also said Clinton's friend Vernon Jordan was assisting Lewinsky. Based on the connection to Jordan, who was under scrutiny in the Whitewater probe, Starr obtained approval from Reno to expand his investigation into whether Lewinsky and others were breaking the law.

A much-quoted statement from Clinton's grand jury testimony showed him questioning the precise use of the word "is". Contending his statement that "there's nothing going on between us" had been truthful because he had no ongoing relationship with Lewinsky at the time he was questioned, Clinton said, "It depends on what the meaning of the word 'is' is. If the—if he—if 'is' means is and never has been, that is not—that is one thing. If it means there is none, that was a completely true statement." Starr obtained further evidence of inappropriate behavior by seizing the computer hard drive and email records of Monica Lewinsky. Based on the president's conflicting testimony, Starr concluded that Clinton had committed perjury. Starr submitted his findings to Congress in a lengthy document, the Starr Report, which was released to the public via the Internet a few days later and included descriptions of encounters between Clinton and Lewinsky. Starr was criticized by Democrats for spending $70 million on the investigation.  Critics of Starr also contend that his investigation was highly politicized because it regularly leaked tidbits of information to the press in violation of legal ethics, and because his report included lengthy descriptions which were humiliating and irrelevant to the legal case.

House of Representatives impeachment inquiry 

On October 8, 1998, the United States House of Representatives voted to authorize a broad impeachment inquiry, thereby initiating the impeachment process. The Republican controlled House of Representatives had decided this with a bipartisan vote of 258–176, with 31 Democrats joining Republicans. Since Ken Starr had already completed an extensive investigation, the House Judiciary Committee conducted no investigations of its own into Clinton's alleged wrongdoing and held no serious impeachment-related hearings before the 1998 midterm elections. Impeachment was one of the major issues in those elections.

In the November 1998 House elections, the Democrats picked up five seats in the House, but the Republicans still maintained majority control. The results went against what House Speaker Newt Gingrich predicted, who, before the election, had been reassured by private polling that Clinton's scandal would result in Republican gains of up to thirty House seats. Shortly after the elections, Gingrich, who had been one of the leading advocates for impeachment, announced he would resign from Congress as soon as he was able to find somebody to fill his vacant seat; Gingrich fulfilled this pledge, and officially resigned from Congress on January 3, 1999.

Impeachment proceedings were held during the post-election, "lame duck" session of the outgoing 105th United States Congress. Unlike the case of the 1974 impeachment process against Richard Nixon, the committee hearings were perfunctory but the floor debate in the whole House was spirited on both sides. The Speaker-designate, Representative Bob Livingston, chosen by the Republican Party Conference to replace Gingrich as House Speaker, announced the end of his candidacy for Speaker and his resignation from Congress from the floor of the House after his own marital infidelity came to light.
In the same speech, Livingston also encouraged Clinton to resign. Clinton chose to remain in office and urged Livingston to reconsider his resignation.
Many other prominent Republican members of Congress (including Dan Burton, Helen Chenoweth, and Henry Hyde, the chief House manager of Clinton's trial in the Senate) had infidelities exposed about this time, all of whom voted for impeachment. Publisher Larry Flynt offered a reward for such information, and many supporters of Clinton accused Republicans of hypocrisy.

Impeachment by House of Representatives 

On December 11, 1998, the House Judiciary Committee agreed to send four articles of impeachment to the full House for consideration. The vote on two articles, grand jury perjury and obstruction of justice, was 21–17, both along party lines. On the third, perjury in the Paula Jones case, the committee voted 20–18, with Republican Lindsey Graham joining with Democrats, in order to give President Clinton "the legal benefit of the doubt". The next day, December 12, the committee agreed to send a fourth and final article, for abuse of power, to the full House by a 21–17 vote, again, along party lines.

Although proceedings were delayed due to the bombing of Iraq, on the passage of H. Res. 611, Clinton was impeached by the House of Representatives on December 19, 1998, on grounds of perjury to a grand jury (first article, 228–206) and obstruction of justice (third article, 221–212). The two other articles were rejected, the count of perjury in the Jones case (second article, 205–229) and abuse of power (fourth article, 148–285). Clinton thus became the second U.S. president to be impeached; the first, Andrew Johnson, was impeached in 1868. The only other previous U.S. president to be the subject of formal House impeachment proceedings was Richard Nixon in 1973–74. The Judiciary Committee agreed to a resolution containing three articles of impeachment in July 1974, but Nixon resigned from office soon thereafter, before the House took up the resolution.

Five Democrats (Virgil Goode, Ralph Hall, Paul McHale, Charles Stenholm and Gene Taylor) voted for the first three articles of impeachment, but only Taylor voted for the abuse of power charge. Five Republicans (Amo Houghton, Peter King, Connie Morella, Chris Shays and Mark Souder) voted against the first perjury charge. Eight more Republicans (Sherwood Boehlert, Michael Castle, Phil English, Nancy Johnson, Jay Kim, Jim Leach, John McHugh and Ralph Regula), but not Souder, voted against the obstruction charge. Twenty-eight Republicans voted against the second perjury charge, sending it to defeat, and eighty-one voted against the abuse of power charge.

Articles referred to Senate 

Article I, charging Clinton with perjury, alleged in part that:

Article II, charging Clinton with obstruction of justice alleged in part that:

Senate trial

Preparation 
Between December 20 and January 5, Republican and Democratic Senate leaders negotiated about the pending trial. There was some discussion about the possibility of censuring Clinton instead of holding a trial. Disagreement arose as to whether to call witnesses. This decision would ultimately not be made until after the opening arguments from the House impeachment managers and the White House defense team. On January 5, Majority Leader Trent Lott, a Republican, announced that the trial would start on January 7.

Officers
Thirteen House Republicans from the Judiciary Committee served as "managers", the equivalent of prosecutors: Henry Hyde (chairman), Jim Sensenbrenner, Bill McCollum, George Gekas, Charles Canady, Steve Buyer, Ed Bryant, Steve Chabot, Bob Barr, Asa Hutchinson, Chris Cannon, James E. Rogan and Lindsey Graham.

Clinton was defended by Cheryl Mills. Clinton's counsel staff included Charles Ruff, David E. Kendall, Dale Bumpers, Bruce Lindsey, Nicole Seligman, Lanny A. Breuer and Gregory B. Craig.

Process and schedule
The Senate trial began on January 7, 1999, with Chief Justice of the United States William Rehnquist presiding. The first day consisted of formal presentation of the charges against Clinton, and of Rehnquist swearing in all senators.

A resolution on rules and procedure for the trial was adopted unanimously on the following day; however, senators tabled the question of whether to call witnesses in the trial. The trial remained in recess while briefs were filed by the House (January 11) and Clinton (January 13).

The managers presented their case over three days, from January 14 to 16, with discussion of the facts and background of the case; detailed cases for both articles of impeachment (including excerpts from videotaped grand jury testimony that Clinton had made the previous August); matters of interpretation and application of the laws governing perjury and obstruction of justice; and argument that the evidence and precedents justified removal of the President from office by virtue of "willful, premeditated, deliberate corruption of the nation's system of justice through perjury and obstruction of justice". The defense presentation took place January 19–21. Clinton's defense counsel argued that Clinton's grand jury testimony had too many inconsistencies to be a clear case of perjury, that the investigation and impeachment had been tainted by partisan political bias, that the President's approval rating of more than 70 percent indicated his ability to govern had not been impaired by the scandal, and that the managers had ultimately presented "an unsubstantiated, circumstantial case that does not meet the constitutional standard to remove the President from office". January 22 and 23 were devoted to questions from members of the Senate to the House managers and Clinton's defense counsel. Under the rules, all questions (over 150) were to be written down and given to Rehnquist to read to the party being questioned.

On January 25, Senator Robert Byrd moved for dismissals of both articles of impeachment. On the following day, Representative Bryant moved to call witnesses to the trial, a question the Senate had scrupulously avoided to that point. In both cases, the Senate voted to deliberate on the question in private session, rather than public, televised procedure. On January 27, the Senate voted on both motions in public session; the motion to dismiss failed on a nearly party line vote of 56–44, while the motion to depose witnesses passed by the same margin. A day later, the Senate voted down motions to move directly to a vote on the articles of impeachment and to suppress videotaped depositions of the witnesses from public release, Senator Russ Feingold again voting with the Republicans.

Over three days, February 1–3, House managers took videotaped closed-door depositions from Monica Lewinsky, Clinton's friend Vernon Jordan, and White House aide Sidney Blumenthal. On February 4, however, the Senate voted 70–30 that excerpting these videotapes would suffice as testimony, rather than calling live witnesses to appear at trial. The videos were played in the Senate on February 6, featuring 30 excerpts of Lewinsky discussing her affidavit in the Paula Jones case, the hiding of small gifts Clinton had given her, and his involvement in procurement of a job for Lewinsky.

On February 8, closing arguments were presented with each side allotted a three-hour time slot. On the President's behalf, White House Counsel Charles Ruff declared:

Chief Prosecutor Henry Hyde countered:

Acquittal 

On February 9, 1999, after voting against a public deliberation on the verdict, the Senate began closed-door deliberations instead. On February 12, 1999, the Senate emerged from its closed deliberations and voted on the articles of impeachment. A two-thirds vote, equal to 67 votes if all Senators voted, would have been necessary to convict on either charge and remove the President from office. The perjury charge was defeated with 45 votes for conviction and 55 against, and the obstruction of justice charge was defeated with 50 for conviction and 50 against. Senator Arlen Specter voted "not proved" for both charges, which was considered by Chief Justice Rehnquist to constitute a vote of "not guilty".  All 45 Democrats in the Senate voted "not guilty" on both charges, as did five Republicans; they were joined by five additional Republicans in voting "not guilty" on the perjury charge.

Subsequent events

Contempt of court citation 

In April 1999, about two months after being acquitted by the Senate, Clinton was cited by federal District Judge Susan Webber Wright for civil contempt of court for his "willful failure" to obey her orders to testify truthfully in the Paula Jones sexual harassment lawsuit. For this, Clinton was assessed a $90,000 fine and the matter was referred to the Arkansas Supreme Court to see if disciplinary action would be appropriate.

Regarding Clinton's January 17, 1998, deposition where he was placed under oath, Webber Wright wrote:

On the day before leaving office on January 20, 2001, Clinton, in what amounted to a plea bargain, agreed to a five-year suspension of his Arkansas law license and to pay a $25,000 fine as part of an agreement with independent counsel Robert Ray to end the investigation without the filing of any criminal charges for perjury or obstruction of justice. Clinton was automatically suspended from the United States Supreme Court bar as a result of his law license suspension. However, as is customary, he was allowed 40 days to appeal the otherwise automatic disbarment. Clinton resigned from the Supreme Court bar during the 40-day appeals period.

Civil settlement with Paula Jones 

Eventually, the court dismissed the Paula Jones harassment lawsuit, before trial, on the grounds that Jones failed to demonstrate any damages. However, while the dismissal was on appeal, Clinton entered into an out-of-court settlement by agreeing to pay Jones $850,000.

Political ramifications 

Polls conducted during 1998 and early 1999 showed that only about one-third of Americans supported Clinton's impeachment or conviction. However, one year later, when it was clear that impeachment would not lead to the ousting of the President, half of Americans said in a CNN/USA Today/Gallup poll that they supported impeachment, 57% approved of the Senate's decision to keep him in office, and two-thirds of those polled said the impeachment was harmful to the country.

While Clinton's job approval rating rose during the Clinton–Lewinsky scandal and subsequent impeachment, his poll numbers with regard to questions of honesty, integrity and moral character declined. As a result, "moral character" and "honesty" weighed heavily in the next presidential election. According to The Daily Princetonian, after the 2000 presidential election, "post-election polls found that, in the wake of Clinton-era scandals, the single most significant reason people voted for Bush was for his moral character."
According to an analysis of the election by Stanford University:

The Stanford analysis, however, presented different theories and mainly argued that Gore had lost because he decided to distance himself from Clinton during the campaign. The writers of it concluded:

According to the America's Future Foundation:

Political commentators have argued that Gore's refusal to have Clinton campaign with him was a bigger liability to Gore than Clinton's scandals. The 2000 U.S. Congressional election also saw the Democrats gain more seats in Congress. As a result of this gain, control of the Senate was split 50–50 between both parties, and Democrats would gain control over the Senate after Republican Senator Jim Jeffords defected from his party in early 2001 and agreed to caucus with the Democrats.

Al Gore reportedly confronted Clinton after the election, and "tried to explain that keeping Clinton under wraps [during the campaign] was a rational response to polls showing swing voters were still mad as hell over the Year of Monica". According to the AP, "during the one-on-one meeting at the White House, which lasted more than an hour, Gore used uncommonly blunt language to tell Clinton that his sex scandal and low personal approval ratings were a hurdle he could not surmount in his campaign... [with] the core of the dispute was Clinton's lies to Gore and the nation about his affair with White House intern Monica Lewinsky." Clinton, however, was unconvinced by Gore's argument and insisted to Gore that he would have won the election if he had embraced the administration and its good economic record.

Partial retraction from Starr

In January 2020, while testifying as a defense lawyer for U.S. President Donald Trump during his first Senate impeachment trial, Starr himself would retract some of the allegations he made to justify Clinton's impeachment. Slate journalist Jeremy Stahl pointed out that as he was urging the Senate not to remove Trump as president, Starr contradicted various arguments he used in 1998 to justify Clinton's impeachment. In defending Trump, Starr also claimed he was wrong to have called for impeachment against Clinton for abuse of executive privilege and efforts to obstruct Congress, and stated that the House Judiciary Committee was right in 1998 to have rejected one of the planks for impeachment he had advocated for. He also invoked a 1999 Hofstra Law Review article by Yale law professor Akhil Amar, who argued that the Clinton impeachment proved just how impeachment and removal causes "grave disruption" to a national election.

See also 

 Impeachment of Andrew Johnson
 Impeachment process against Richard Nixon
 First impeachment of Donald Trump
 Second impeachment of Donald Trump
 List of federal political scandals in the United States
 List of federal political sex scandals in the United States
 Second-term curse
 Sexual misconduct allegations against Bill Clinton

Notes

References

External links 

 "The Articles Explained". The Washington Post. (December 18, 1998.) Archived August 16th, 2000 from the original link.
 "The Starr Report", The Washington Post (September 16, 1998)
 "Impeachment of William Jefferson Clinton, President of the United States, Report of the Committee on the Judiciary, House of Representatives, together with additional, minority, and dissenting views" (H. Rpt. 105-830) (440 pages), December 16, 1998
 "Dale Bumpers: Closing Defense Arguments—Impeachment Trial of William J. Clinton"

 
105th United States Congress
1998 in American politics
Clinton administration controversies
Clinton–Lewinsky scandal
Articles containing video clips
Perjury
Obstruction of justice
December 1998 events in the United States